In ethnohistory, a lienzo (Spanish for "canvas") is a sheet of cloth painted with indigenous Mesoamerican pictorial writing.

See also
Mesoamerican writing systems

Mesoamerican documents
Spanish words and phrases